Kaathoven is a hamlet in the municipality of 's-Hertogenbosch, province of North Brabant, the Netherlands. The community's geographical coordinates are 51° 42' 0" North, 5° 28' 0" East.

Populated places in North Brabant
's-Hertogenbosch